The Sound of the Violin in My Lai (Vietnamese: Tiếng vĩ cầm ở Mỹ Lai) is a short film that examines the history and legacy of the My Lai massacre, an incident of the Vietnam War in which hundreds of Vietnamese civilians were massacred by U.S. Army soldiers.  The film investigates the effects of the massacre, with the story centering on the return of American soldiers Hugh Thompson and Larry Colburn to My Lai on the 30th anniversary of the event.

The film was commissioned by the Vietnamese government. It garnered director Tran Van Thuy the Best Documentary Prize at the Asia Pacific Film Festival in year 2000.

The violin referenced in the title is that of American Vietnam veteran and peace activist Roy Boehm.

Plot
The film is about the massacre that occurred in Sơn Mỹ on the morning of March 16, 1968, when the US army killed 504 civilians within 4 hours. Despite its dark theme, the film conveys a message of hope and redemption - and the message of forgetting the past and looking towards the future. The main violinist is a US Air Force veteran, Mike Boehm.

Boehm returned to Vietnam in an attempt to atone for atrocities committed by the US military against the people of Sơn Mỹ. One of Boehm's pursuits is playing the violin - both for living people and for the souls of the dead.

The film was shown on Vietnamese television on the 30th anniversary of the massacre. On the same day, US Ambassador Pete Peterson and former President Bill Clinton apologized to the Vietnamese people for this massacre.

Awards

References

External links 
 THE SOUND OF THE VIOLIN IN MY LAI
 My Lai Peace Park
 New York Times summary
 

1998 films
Vietnamese documentary films
Mỹ Lai massacre
1998 documentary films
Documentary films about the Vietnam War
Documentary films about war crimes